Thomas Edge (28 April 1898 – 1966) was a professional footballer. An outside right, he played in the Football League for Manchester City, Oldham Athletic, Exeter City, Blackpool and New Brighton. He also played for Brook Valley, Treherbert, Winsford United, Stockport Wednesday and Stockport Thursday.

References

1898 births
1966 deaths
Footballers from Leigh, Greater Manchester
Manchester City F.C. players
Oldham Athletic A.F.C. players
Exeter City F.C. players
Blackpool F.C. players
New Brighton Tower F.C. players
Winsford United F.C. players
Place of birth missing
Place of death missing
Date of death missing
Association football outside forwards
English footballers